Harley Lam also known as Lam Yat Ting (born 31 May 1999 in Hong Kong) is a Hong Kong professional squash player. As of July 2022, he was ranked number 191 in the world.

References

1999 births
Living people
Hong Kong male squash players
Competitors at the 2022 World Games